"Girls, Girls, Girls" is the second single from rapper Jay-Z's album The Blueprint (2001). The single was released on October 2, 2001. It is a playful description of the artist's promiscuous lifestyle. The song contains a sample of "There's Nothing In This World That Can Stop Me From Loving You" by Tom Brock, who died a year later. The chorus features a lyrical interpolation of "High Power Rap" by Crash Crew. The song has additional vocals sung by Q-Tip, Slick Rick and Biz Markie, but they are not credited as featured guests on the back artwork; they are, however, credited in the album's liner notes.

A remix of the song produced by Kanye West can be found as a hidden track on The Blueprint after the songs "Blueprint (Momma Loves Me)" and the other hidden song "Lyrical Exercise". The remix is composed of new verses by Jay-Z, a new instrumental sampling "Trying Girls Out" by The Persuaders and uncredited vocals from Michael Jackson and Chante Moore. Just Blaze originally produced the song for Ghostface Killah.

Music video
The video (directed by Marc Klasfeld) was filmed in September 2001 in Los Angeles, California. Jay-Z stated in a 2011 interview that he was in Los Angeles preparing for the shoot when the September 11 terrorist attacks took place:

Actresses Carmen Electra, Tamala Jones, and Paula Jai Parker, all make cameo appearances in the song's music video. Damon Dash, Biz Markie, and Kanye West also make brief appearances in the video.

Jay-Z wore the Mitchell & Ness 1947 Washington Redskins jersey of Hall of Fame quarterback Sammy Baugh as well as a 1982 San Diego Padres jersey. This increased demand for the throwback jersey and renewed popular awareness of Baugh.

Credits and personnel
The credits for "Girls, Girls, Girls" are adapted from the liner notes of The Blueprint.
Studio locations
 Mastered at Masterdisk, New York City, New York.
 Mixed and recorded at Baseline Studios, New York City, New York.

Personnel
 Jay-Z – songwriting, vocals
 Just Blaze – production, songwriting
 Tom Brock – songwriting
 Robert Relf – songwriting
 Young Guru – recording
 Kamel Adbo – recording
 Jason Goldstein – mixing
 Q-Tip – additional vocals
 Slick Rick – additional vocals
 Biz Markie – additional vocals
 Tony Dawsey – mastering

Samples
 "Girls, Girls, Girls" contains samples of "There's Nothing in This World That Can Stop Me from Loving You", as performed by Tom Brock and written by Brock and Robert Relf.

Charts

Weekly charts

Year-end charts

See also
List of songs recorded by Jay-Z

References

2001 singles
Jay-Z songs
Music videos directed by Marc Klasfeld
Song recordings produced by Just Blaze
Songs written by Jay-Z
Songs written by Just Blaze
2001 songs
Roc-A-Fella Records singles